The Popular Front for Change and Liberation (al-Jabha aš-š‘abiyya li'l-taghayyir wa'l-taḥrīr) is a coalition of Syrian political parties and is the leader of the official political opposition within the People's Council of Syria, the state's unicameral parliament.

History and profile
The front was established in August 2011. Coalition leader Qadri Jamil stated that there had been numerous violations in favor of their opponent, the National Progressive Front, in the 2012 parliamentary election. The Popular Front for Change and Liberation brought together Jamil's People’s Will Party, Ali Haidar's Syrian Social Nationalist Party – Intifada, and others.

They have criticized the ruling party on occasion, particularly after the 2012 parliamentary election, when Qadri Jamil questioned the transparency of the vote and considered giving up his seat depending on the government's response, and a member of the SSNP complained about the Ba'ath party's domination of parliament.

Leader of the SSNP-Intifada Ali Haidar announced on 6 May 2014 that his party was withdrawing from the Popular Front for Change and Liberation over a difference in positions towards the 2014 presidential election. The SSNP supported the re-election of Bashar al-Assad.

On 10 August 2014, the remaining Popular Front signed a Memorandum of Understanding with the National Coordination Body for Democratic Change in Syria, calling for ″comprehensive grassroots change, which means the transition from the current authoritarian regime to a democratic pluralistic system within a democratic civil State based on the principle of equal citizenship to all Syrians regardless of their ethnic, religious and sectarian identities.″

References

2011 establishments in Syria
Political parties established in 2011
Organizations of the Syrian civil war
Political party alliances in Syria
Popular fronts
Syrian Social Nationalist Party
Secularism in Syria
Syrian nationalism